Brachinus texanus is a species of ground beetle in the genus Brachinus ("bombardier beetles"), in the family Carabidae ("ground beetles").
It is found in North America. Like other bombardier beetles, it can spray a boiling, corrosive liquid from its abdomen if provoked, and as such SHOULD NOT be handled.

References

Further reading
 Arnett, R.H. Jr., and M. C. Thomas. (eds.). (2000). American Beetles, Volume I: Archostemata, Myxophaga, Adephaga, Polyphaga: Staphyliniformia. CRC Press LLC, Boca Raton, FL.
 Arnett, Ross H. (2000). American Insects: A Handbook of the Insects of America North of Mexico. CRC Press.
 Bousquet, Yves (2012). "Catalogue of Geadephaga (Coleoptera, Adephaga) of America, north of Mexico". ZooKeys, issue 245, 1–1722.
 Erwin, Terry L. (2011). A Treatise on the Western Hemisphere Caraboidea (Coleoptera): Their classification, distributions, and ways of life, volume III. Carabidae - Loxomeriformes, Melaeniformes, 412.
 Richard E. White. (1983). Peterson Field Guides: Beetles. Houghton Mifflin Company.

Brachininae
Beetles described in 1868